Sasunik is a village in the Ashtarak Municipality of the Aragatsotn Province of Armenia. It was founded as a collective farm in 1955, and villagers were resettled from the old village of Sasunik in 1960.

Gallery

References 

 (as Nor Sasunik)
World Gazetteer: Armenia – World-Gazetteer.com

External links 

Cities and towns built in the Soviet Union
Populated places in Aragatsotn Province
Populated places established in 1955
1955 establishments in Armenia